State Route 387, also known as SR 387, is a state highway in south-central Arizona, United States traveling from State Route 87 west of Coolidge west to Interstate 10, then south to its junction with State Route 84 and State Route 287 in Casa Grande.

Route description
SR 387 is a  highway that connects Casa Grande with I-10 and SR 87.  The southern terminus of the highway is located at an intersection with SR 84 and SR 287 in Casa Grande.  It heads north through the city from this intersection to the Gila River Indian Reservation before reaching I-10.  After the interchange with I-10, the highway intersects SR 187, with SR 387 turning towards the east at the intersection.  The highway continues to the east-northeast until it reaches its northern terminus at SR 87.

History
The route was established between 1946 and 1951, from SR 187 to SR 87 just south of Sun Lakes. Between 1958 and 1961, it was cancelled, and became part of SR 93, a proposed extension of US 93. In 1967, SR 387 was designated from SR 93 to SR 87. It extended south over part of SR 93 on December 17, 1984.

Junction list

References

External links

SR 387 at Arizona Roads

387
Transportation in Pinal County, Arizona
Casa Grande, Arizona
Gila River Indian Community